TAP-associated glycoprotein, also known as tapasin or TAPBP, is a protein that in humans is encoded by the TAPBP gene.

Function 

The TAPBP gene encodes a transmembrane glycoprotein that mediates interaction between newly assembled major histocompatibility complex (MHC) class I molecules and the transporter associated with antigen processing (TAP), which is required for the transport of antigenic peptides across the endoplasmic reticulum membrane. This interaction facilitates optimal peptide loading on the MHC class I molecule. Up to four complexes of MHC class I and tapasin may be bound to a single TAP molecule. Tapasin contains a C-terminal double-lysine motif (KKKAE) known to maintain membrane proteins in the endoplasmic reticulum. In humans, the tapasin gene lies within the major histocompatibility complex on chromosome 6. Alternative splicing results in three transcript variants encoding different isoforms.

Tapasin is a MHC class I antigen-processing molecule present in the lumen of the endoplasmic reticulum. It plays an important role in the maturation of MHC class I molecules in the ER lumen. Tapasin is one component of the peptide-loading complex, and can be found associated with MHC class I molecules after the MHC class I heavy chain has associated with  Beta2 microglobulin. The peptide-loading complex consists of TAP, tapasin, MHC class I, calreticulin, and ERp57. Tapasin recruits MHC class I molecules to the TAP peptide transporter, and also enhances loading of MHC class I with high-affinity peptides. Following loading of MHC class I with a high-affinity ligand, the interaction between tapasin and MHC class I disappears.

Interactions 

Tapasin has been shown to interact with:
 HLA-A, and
 TAP1

See also 
 Transporter associated with antigen processing ("TAP")

References

Further reading

External links 
 
 PDBe-KB provides an overview of all the structure information available in the PDB for Human Tapasin